Corruption remains a serious problem for doing business in Nicaragua. Transparency International's 2021 Corruption Perceptions Index gave Nicaragua a score of 20 on a scale from 0 ("highly corrupt") to 100 ("highly clean"). When ranked by score, Nicaragua ranked number 164 among the 180 countries in the Index, where the country ranked number 1 is perceived to have the most honest public sector. According to Freedom House, since the election of Daniel Ortega in 2006, corruption had increased in Nicaragua.

Analysis 
According to Foreign Policy, following his loss in the 1990 presidential election, Daniel Ortega spent the next decade building alliances with former political enemies, which helped him win the 2006 presidential election. After assuming the presidency, Ortega used various means to maintain his power in Nicaragua. Ortega "used devious legal measures to harass those who refused to align with him", which included former allies and members of the Sandinista front.

Ortega then built an uneasy alliance with the business community, specifically Nicaragua's business organization COSEP, which resulted in less antagonism between his government and private business. This move by Ortega was similar to tactics used by the Somoza family dictatorship which ruled Nicaragua for the decades prior to Ortega's ascent.

According to Freedom House, Nicaragua was among its Largest 10-Year Score Declines list in its Freedom in the World 2017 report, with the human rights organization stating:

Bribery 
Some businesses have suggested that facilitation payments are demanded from the authorities when conducting commercial activities in Nicaragua and the government often shows favoritism towards certain well-connected companies.

Cronyism 
The New York Times reports that when rising to power, Ortega often used union groups to protest and for other political motives. After taking power, he granted union leaders good positions within the Nicaraguan government.

According to Foreign policy prior to his re-election in the 2016 election, Ortega's wife Rosario Murillo had gained power over much of the Nicaraguan government, controlling all of the social programs of the country. When Murillo became involved in politics, Nicaraguans began to compare President Ortega's family and political practices to that of the Somoza family dictatorship.

By the time of the 2018–2020 Nicaraguan protests, The New York Times stated that Ortega and his wife hold power of the branches of government and media in Nicaragua. With this power, Ortega influenced judges and legislators to get rid of constitutional term limits, allowing Ortega to maintain power. Both opponents and supporters agreed that Ortega's wife, who was named vice president, held power over him in. Ortega's children have also been rewarded powerful positions within the government.

Anti-corruption efforts 
Generally, Nicaragua has a well-developed legislative framework preventing and criminalizing corruption. Nicaragua has also signed several international agreements, such as the Dominican Republic-Central American Free Trade Agreement and the United Nations Convention against Corruption. In practicality, Nicaragua's anti-corruption institutions are highly subject to political influences.

References

External links
 Nicaragua Corruption Profile from the Business-Anti-Corruption Portal

Crime in Nicaragua by type
Nicaragua
Nicaragua